Jonathon Noë Joseph Pines (born 1961)   is Head of the Cancer Biology Division at the Institute of Cancer Research in London. He was formerly a senior group leader at the Gurdon Institute at the University of Cambridge.

Education
Pines was educated at the University of Cambridge where he was awarded a PhD in 1987 for research on cyclin in sea urchin eggs supervised by Tim Hunt.

Research and career
Following his PhD, Pines was a postdoctoral researcher supervised by Anthony R. Hunter at the Salk Institute in La Jolla, California before moving to the Gurdon Institute at the University of Cambridge then the Institute of Cancer Research in 2015.

Pines research investigates cyclin, the cell cycle and mitosis. He pioneered the use of fluorescent tags to analyse the dynamic behaviour and stability of these regulators in living cells.

Pines discoveries have revealed that mitotic regulators are targeted to specific substructures at specific times, and that mitosis is exquisitely coordinated by the destruction of key regulators at different times in cell division. Pines work has provided insights into how chromosome behaviour in mitosis controls both the time and the rate at which essential mitotic regulators are destroyed, and these discoveries have wider implications for how cancers develop.

Since 2020, Pines has been Editor-in-Chief of the Royal Society journal Open Biology.

Awards and honours
Pines was elected a member of the European Molecular Biology Organisation (EMBO) in 2001 and a Fellow of the Academy of Medical Sciences (FMedSci) in 2005. His citation on election reads:

Pines was elected a Fellow of the Royal Society (FRS) in 2016.

References

Living people
Fellows of the Royal Society
Members of the European Molecular Biology Organization
Fellows of the Academy of Medical Sciences (United Kingdom)
1961 births
Alumni of the University of Cambridge
Biologists at the University of Cambridge
Academics of the Institute of Cancer Research